Julien Christian Lutz (born October 31, 1975), known professionally as Director X, is a Canadian filmmaker, commercial director, music video director, and television director. Having directed more than 100 music videos, he is widely known as a prolific music video director in the industry. He has also directed feature films and television series.

Early life
Lutz was born and raised in the Greater Toronto Area, mostly in and around Brampton, and is of mixed Trinidadian and Swiss descent.

Career

Early work 
Lutz began his career working on several productions; he was a visual consultant on Hype Williams' 1998 film Belly. Lutz was slated to direct the horror feature Razorwire, though the film never moved into production.

Music videos 
After working on several of his projects, Lutz became a protégé of Hype Williams. Since the late 1990s, Lutz has directed dozens of music videos for popular artists and been noted for his high-budget, visually distinctive music videos for popular hit singles, including videos for The Wanted, R. Kelly, Usher, Kanye West, Jay-Z, Korn, David Guetta, Nelly Furtado, Sean Paul, Justin Bieber, Drake, Nicki Minaj, T.I., Little Mix, Rihanna, Union J, Fifth Harmony, Miguel, One Direction, Zayn Malik and Iggy Azalea. In 2004, Lutz appeared in Mya Baker's documentary film Silence: In Search of Black Female Sexuality in America.

In 2015, Lutz founded his own production company, Popp Rok, in Toronto. In 2017, he appeared on episode 7 of America's Next Top Model Cycle 23, "X Marks The Spot", as the director for a Gypsy-Sports-themed music video.

Feature films

Across the Line 

In addition to music video directing, Lutz has directed three feature films and a television film; he made his feature directorial debut in 2015 with Across the Line. The film starred Stephan James and the storyline was inspired by the 1989 Cole Harbour District High School race riots.

Across the Line was set and shot in Nova Scotia. The first screening of Across the Line was 19 September 2015 at the Atlantic Film Festival where it won the award for "Best Atlantic Feature". The film opened for limited release in British Columbia and Ontario on 8 April 2016, with screenings in various Canadian cities throughout that month. The National Post assessed the film at 2.5/4 stars, noting the story's unwavering focus on racial themes was "to the detriment of the film's depth and realism" but noted that video producer Director X "makes the transition to feature film-making look easy". In 2017, the film was the subject of an episode of The Filmmakers, the CBC's web talk series on Canadian film.

Center Stage: On Pointe 

In 2016, he directed the teen drama television film Center Stage: On Pointe. The film stars Nicole Muñoz, Barton Cowperthwaite, Maude Green, Chloe Lukasiak, Kenny Wormald and Peter Gallagher. It premiered on Lifetime on June 25, 2016. The official DVD was released in September 6, 2016.

The film is the third installment in the Center Stage film series, following the 2000 film Center Stage and its sequel, Center Stage: Turn It Up. Variety critic Sonia Saraiya found Center Stage: On Pointe wholly inferior to the original Center Stage, though she complimented Lutz's direction, noting "...though it is frustrating that the film feels like 15-odd low-budget music videos strung together, the dance in those segments, and the way it's filmed, are some of the best parts of the movie."

Superfly

In 2018, Lutz directed Superfly, a remake of the 1972 blaxploitation film of the same name. Superfly was released in the United States on June 13, 2018 and received mixed reviews from critics. On review aggregator website Rotten Tomatoes, the film holds an approval rating of 51% based on 73 reviews, and an average rating of 5.4/10. The website's critical consensus reads, "Superfly updates the blaxploitation original with a stylish remake that's short on social subtext, but still exciting and visually arresting enough to offer its own slickly staged action rewards." Varietys Owen Gleiberman wrote: "Shot in a functional, slammed-together manner that's less sensually stylish than you'd expect from a music-video auteur, the film is a competent yet glossy and hermetic street-hustle drug thriller, less a new urban myth than a lavishly concocted episode. It holds your attention yet leaves you with nothing."

Filmography

Television series 
 2020: October Faction
 2022: The Imperfects

Feature films 

 2015: Across the Line
 2016: Center Stage: On Pointe
 2018: Superfly

Music videos 
2022

Future featuring Drake and Tems - "Wait for U"
Black Eyed Peas, Shakira and David Guetta - "Don't You Worry"
Drake - "Falling Back"

2021
Rosalía featuring The Weeknd - "La Fama"

2020
Ariana Grande - "34+35"
Demi Lovato - "Commander in Chief"
Future featuring Drake - "Life Is Good"
Lil Yachty and DaBaby featuring Drake - "Oprah's Bank Account"
DJ Khaled featuring Drake - "Popstar"
Black Eyed Peas, Ozuna and J. Rey Soul - "Mamacita"

2019
Khalid - "Right Back"
Rosalía and J Balvin featuring El Guincho - "Con Altura"

2018 
French Montana - "Famous"

2017
Miguel featuring Travis Scott - "Sky Walker"
Bebe Rexha featuring Lil Wayne - "The Way I Are (Dance with Somebody)"
Little Mix - "Touch"
DJ Snake featuring Jeremih, Young Thug and Swizz Beatz - "The Half"

2016
Zayn - "Like I Would"
Rihanna featuring Drake - "Work"
Fifth Harmony featuring Ty Dolla Sign - "Work from Home"
Little Mix featuring Sean Paul - "Hair"
Fifth Harmony featuring Fetty Wap - "All in My Head (Flex)"

2015
Drake - "Hotline Bling" 
Iggy Azalea featuring Jennifer Hudson - "Trouble"
Flo Rida featuring Robin Thicke and Verdine White - "I Don't Like It, I Love It"
Jamie Foxx featuring Chris Brown - "You Changed Me"
Kendrick Lamar - "King Kunta"
Little Mix - "Black Magic"

2014
Union J - "Tonight (We Live Forever)"
DJ Cassidy featuring R. Kelly - "Make the World Go Round"
Jennifer Hudson featuring Timbaland - "Walk It Out"
DJ Cassidy featuring Robin Thicke and Jessie J - "Calling All Hearts"
Iggy Azalea featuring Charli XCX - "Fancy"
T.I. featuring Iggy Azalea - "No Mediocre"
Iggy Azalea featuring Rita Ora - "Black Widow"
Wiz Khalifa - "Stayin Out All Night"

2013
Drake - "Worst Behavior"
Busta Rhymes - "Twerk It"
The-Dream - "IV Play"
Ciara - "Body Party"
Angel - "The World"
Drake - "Started from the Bottom"
Little Mix - "Little Me"

2012
R. Kelly - "Share My Love"
Drake - "HYFR"
Shanell featuring Lil Wayne and Drake - "So Good/6 AM"
Nelly Furtado - "Big Hoops (Bigger the Better)"
The Wanted - "Chasing The Sun"
Justin Bieber - "Boyfriend"
2 Chainz featuring Drake - "No Lie"
Rick Ross featuring Wale and Drake - "Diced Pineapples"
Manika - "Good Girls"

2011
Karl Wolf featuring Kardinal Offishall - "Ghetto Love"
Mohombi featuring Nicole Scherzinger - "Coconut Tree"
The Wanted - "Glad You Came"
The Wanted - "Warzone"

2010
Street Pharmacy - "Stone Bricks And Mortar"
Sean Kingston - "Letting Go (Dutty Love)"
Nicki Minaj - "Your Love"
The-Dream - "Love King"

2009
Birdman featuring Lil Wayne, Rick Ross and Young Jeezy - "Always Strapped"
K-os featuring Saukrates and Nelly Furtado - "I Wish I Knew Natalie Portman"
K-os - "Robot Kid"
Sean Paul - "Now That I've Got Your Love"
Nelly Furtado - "Más"
Sean Paul - "Hold My Hand"
David Guetta featuring Estelle - "One Love"
Nelly Furtado - "Manos al Aire"
Estelle featuring Sean Paul - "Come Over"

2008
Brandy  - "Right Here (Departed)"
Common - "Universal Mind Control" (Original Version)
Deborah Cox  - "Beautiful U R"

2007
R. Kelly featuring Usher - "Same Girl"
Chrisette Michele - "Be OK"
Trey Songz - "Wonder Woman"
Baby Bash featuring Sean Kingston - "What Is It"

2006
Sean Paul featuring Keyshia Cole - "Give It Up to Me"
Korn - "Coming Undone"
Keshia Chanté - "Been Gone"
Nelly Furtado featuring Timbaland - "Promiscuous"
The Game - "Let's Ride"
Xzibit - "Concentrate"
Cassie - "Me & U" (original version)

2005
Usher - Rhythm City Volume One: Caught Up (20 minute short film)
Sean Paul - "Temperature"
Ludacris - "Pimpin' All Over the World"
David Banner - "Play"
Rico Love - "Settle Down"
Rihanna - "Pon de Replay"
Ray J - "One Wish"
R. Kelly - "Happy People"
R. Kelly - "U Saved Me" (directed under his real name Julien Christian Lutz)
Ying Yang Twins - "Wait (The Whisper Song)"
Usher - "Caught Up"

2004
Lloyd Banks featuring Avant - "Karma"
Mario - "Let Me Love You"
Kanye West - "The New Workout Plan"
Keshia Chanté - "Does He Love Me?"
Nelly featuring Christina Aguilera - "Tilt Ya Head Back"
Akon - "Ghetto"
Usher featuring Ludacris and Lil Jon - "Yeah"

2003
Clipse featuring Faith Evans - "Ma, I Don't Love Her"
G-Unit - "Poppin' Them Thangs"
Ginuwine - "There It Is"
Keshia Chanté - "Bad Boy"
Sean Paul featuring Sasha - "I'm Still In Love With You"
Timbaland featuring Missy Elliott and Magoo - "Cop That Disk"
Loon - "How You Want That"
John Mayer - "Clarity"
Sean Paul - "Get Busy"
Wayne Wonder - "No Letting Go"
Kelis - "Trick Me"
Jay-Z featuring The Neptunes - "Excuse Me Miss"
Melanie Durrant featuring Common - "Where I'm Goin'"
Daniel Bedingfield - "Gotta Get Thru This"

2002
Aaliyah - "I Care 4 U"
Craig David - "What's Your Flava?"
Sean Paul - "Gimme the Light"
Benzino - "Rock The Party"
Tweet - "Boogie / Smoking Cigarettes (unreleased)"
Nelly - "Hot in Herre"
Eve featuring Alicia Keys - "Gangsta Lovin'"
Alicia Keys - "How Come U Don't Call Me Anymore?"
Donell Jones featuring Styles P - "Put Me Down"
Usher - "U Don't Have to Call"

2001
Destiny's Child featuring Missy Elliott - "Bootylicious" (Rockwilder Remix)
112 - "Peaches and Cream"
Fabolous featuring Nate Dogg - "Can't Deny It"
Foxy Brown - “BK Anthem”
Foxy Brown featuring Spragga Benz - “Oh Yeah”
Jadakiss - "Knock Yourself Out"
Usher - "U Got It Bad"
R. Kelly featuring Jay Z - "Fiesta" (Remix)
Kardinal Offishall - "Ol' Time Killin'"

2000

 M.O.P. - Ante Up (Robbin-Hoodz Theory)
Reflection Eternal featuring Vinia Mojica - "The Blast"
Mystikal featuring Pharrell - "Shake Ya Ass"
Mystikal featuring Nivea - "Danger (Been So Long)"
Ice Cube featuring Krayzie Bone - "Until We Rich" (co-directed with Cameron Casey)
Ghostface Killah featuring Madam Majestic and U-God - "Cherchez La Ghost"
Donell Jones - "Where I Wanna Be"
Beanie Sigel featuring Eve - "Remember Them Days"
Sisqó featuring Foxy Brown - "Thong Song" (Remix)
Aaliyah featuring DMX - "Come Back in One Piece"

1999
Case - "Happily Ever After"
Choclair - "Let's Ride"
Chris Rock - "No Sex (In the Champagne Room)"
Terry Dexter – "Better Than Me"
DMX - "What's My Name?"
Eric Benét featuring Faith Evans - "Georgy Porgy"
Marvelous 3 - "Freak of the Week"
Mystikal featuring Outkast - "Neck Uv Da Woods"
Ice Cube featuring Mack 10 and Ms. Toi - "You Can Do It" (co-directed with Cameron Casey)

1998
N.O.R.E. featuring Big Pun, Nature, Cam'ron, Jadakiss and Styles P - "Banned from T.V."
Made Men featuring The L.O.X. - "Tommy's Theme"
Onyx featuring 50 Cent, Bonifucco, Still Livin' and X1 - "React"
Onyx - "Broke Willies"
Rascalz - "Northern Touch"
Redman - "I'll Bee Dat!"
Maestro - "Stick to Your Vision"
Ghetto Concept - "Crazy World"
Glenn Lewis - "Bout Your Love"
Total - "Sittin' Home"
EPMD - "Richter Scale"

Commercials 

2008 - McCafe "Kiss" Spot - McDonald's
2010 - Yeo Boyz  - Yeo Valley Organic
2018 - Gap - (fashion)

References

Books
 Henry Keazor, Thorsten Wübbena: Video Thrills The Radio Star. Musikvideos: Geschichte, Themen, Analysen. Bielefeld 2005, p. 111ss.

External links
 X Fit
 
 Director X in Toronto Star

1975 births
Black Canadian filmmakers
Canadian music video directors
Canadian people of Swiss descent
Canadian people of Trinidad and Tobago descent
Living people
Film directors from Toronto
People from Brampton
Juno Award for Video of the Year winners